Tanjung Manis is a district, in Mukah Division, Sarawak, Malaysia. The capital of the district is Tanjung Manis town.

History

The Tanjung Manis District was originally named "Belawai sub-district" on 7 April 1973 and was placed under the administration of Sarikei Division. On 1 March 2002, Belawai sub-district was placed under the administration of Mukah Division. On 11 February 2008, Sarawak Corridor of Renewable Energy (SCORE) was launched. The town of Tanjung Manis is designated as halal food hub and Tanjung Manis Integrated Port was built here. On 1 August 2015, the Belawai sub-district was concurrently upgraded into a district and renamed to Tanjung Manis District.

Administration
Tanjung Manis District covers an area of 730.53 km2.

Town and villages

Tanjung Manis
The government of Sarawak started to develop this area in the 1990s because of its strategic location as a protected harbour for timber processing industry. In 1994, the construction of timber processing zone (TPZ) was completed. About 1,000 houses were built in 1995. Central oil distribution terminal was completed in 2002. There were 40 shophouses as of January 2022. In November 2022, 16-storey Tanjung Manis administrative centre was built. The administrative centre commence operation in 2023.

Belawai
Belawai was the former administrative centre for Tanjung Manis district. Based on a census in 2018, Belawai village occupies 3,730 hectares with 2,823 inhabitants. The village is also notable for its beaches and fishery industry. In 2023, Tanjung Manis district office was moved from Belawai to the town of Tanjung Manis.

Jerijeh
Jerijeh village is located 20 km from the town of Tanjung Manis. Tanjung Manis airport is located here.

Rajang
Rajang village developed its own songket weaving industry since 1991.

Population
The majority of the population in the district are Melanau.

Economy
Tanjung Manis District has been designated as a growth area under Sarawak Corridor of Renewable Energy (SCORE) since 2008 as aquaculture, timber-based, and marine engineering industry. As a result of this plan, Integrated Deep Sea Fishing Port, Tanjung Manis Integrated Port and Oil Gas Chemical terminal, and a wood-based industrial area were set up.

The district is famous for its fishery industry, especially the catches of giant tiger prawn (known as Udang harimau locally). There is also s small-scale prawn processing industry. The prawns' shells are removed and put into cold storage or made into smoked prawns to be sold later to nearby towns and cities, especially Sibu.

Transportation

Water
Tanjung Manis anchorage existed from the 1950s to 60s for ocean-going vessels to load and unload goods. In the 1990s, Japan International Corporation Agency recommended the Sarawak government build port facilities at Tanjung Manis anchorage site. The project was completed in November 1997. After the 1997 Asian financial crisis, the Tanjung Manis port was underutilised due to the absence of road access to the town of Sibu. In 2009, Tanjung Manis Integrated Port Sdn. Bhd (a subsidiary of Sarawak Timber Development Corporation (STIDC)), started to oversee the port operations. The port started to receive more traffic since then.

Air
There is an airport in the district named Tanjung Manis Airport.

Road 
Although 70% of Tanjung Manis District can be accessed by roads, 30% of the areas still requires water transport such as Paloh, Stalun, Sebayang, Sungai Berangan and Telok Gelam. The district is connected to Sibu through a network of trunk road and ferry services.

Culture and leisure

Attraction and recreational spots

With the construction of Sibu-Tanjung Manis road, the Belawai beach is more accessible to the public.

References